Seguros Bolívar Open may refer to the following tennis tournaments:

Seguros Bolívar Open Barranquilla
Seguros Bolívar Open Bogotá
Seguros Bolívar Open Bucaramanga
Seguros Bolívar Open Cali
Seguros Bolívar Open Medellín
Seguros Bolívar Open Pereira
Seguros Bolívar Open San José